Dame Daphne Marjorie Sheldrick,  (née Jenkins; 4 June 1934 – 12 April 2018) was a Kenyan of British descent, author, conservationist and expert in animal husbandry, particularly the raising and reintegrating of orphaned elephants into the wild for over 30 years. She was the founder of the Sheldrick Wildlife Trust.

Biography

Early life 
Daphne Jenkins was born in Kenya in 1934 to British parents, at a time when Kenya was still a British colony. Her parents, Bryan Jenkins and Marjorie Webb Jenkins, operated a large farm and timber operation in Gilgil. At the outbreak of World War II, her father, a naturalist, was sent to a game reserve where he was ordered to kill zebra and wildebeest to feed British and Kenyan troops. In 1940, at age 6, she went to visit her father's camp and later remember thinking, "This is how I would like to live, out here among the animals under the sky."

She was educated at Nakuru Primary School and Kenya High School where she matriculated in 1950 with honours and the possibility of a bursary to attend university; however, she opted for marriage.

Adult years 
In 1953, she married Bill Woodley, who battled wildlife poaching in Kenya's game reserves. They ultimately divorced, and on 20 October 1960 she married Woodley's boss, David Sheldrick. From 1955-76, she was co-warden of Tsavo National Park with her husband. The couple began caring for all different kinds of orphaned animals, always with a point of reintegrating them into the wild. Many of these young animals were elephants, and Sheldrick began hand-feeding them a milk formula she developed herself.

During this time, Sheldrick raised and rehabilitated back into the wild community orphans of misfortune from many different wild species, including elephants, black rhinos, buffalo, zebras, elands, kudus, impalas, duikers, reedbuck, dikdiks, warthogs, civets, mongooses and birds. Sheldrick was a recognised authority on the rearing of wild creatures and was the first person to perfect the milk formula and necessary husbandry for both infant milk-dependent elephants and rhinos. When she first made attempts to keep the orphaned baby elephants alive with traditional milk sources, they remained malnourished and faded into death. It was only after trying every combination she could find that she hit on one milk formula from Europe containing coconut oil that was found to be the nearest substitute for the fat in elephant milk. 

Daphne Sheldrick died on 12 April 2018 at the age of 83 after a battle with breast cancer.

Sheldrick Wildlife Trust

After 17 years of marriage, David Sheldrick died on 13 June 1977 at the age of 57. Following her husband's death, Daphne Sheldrick continued her dedicated conservation efforts. Sheldrick and her daughter, Jill, cared for a seeming continuous succession of orphaned elephants and rhinos. As a result, the David Sheldrick Memorial Appeal, a project of the African Wildlife Project, metamorphosed into the David Sheldrick Wildlife Trust in 1987; becoming an independent non-profit organisation.  Embracing the conservation, preservation, and protection of wildlife in Kenya, the Sheldrick Wildlife Trust--renamed in February 2019 to honor Daphne and the whole Sheldrick family--today operates the most successful orphan-elephant rescue and rehabilitation program in the world. It works alongside Anti-Poaching Teams, Mobile Veterinary Units, Aerial Surveillance, and a Sky Vet initiative in partnership with the Kenya Wildlife Service. Other projects which aim to safeguard the natural environment and enhance community awareness include Saving Habitats and Community Outreach projects.

Best known for its pioneering Orphans' Project, the Sheldrick Wildlife Trust has successfully rescued over 262 orphaned elephants and reintegrated over 160 back into the wild.

Honours

For her work as a conservationist, Sheldrick was awarded an MBE by Queen Elizabeth II in the 1989 Birthday Honours, and separately elevated to UNEP's Global 500 Roll of Honour in 1992, where she was among the first 500 people worldwide to have been accorded this particular honour. Sheldrick was also awarded an Honorary Doctorate in Veterinary Medicine and Surgery by Glasgow University in June 2000.  In December 2001 her work was honoured by the Kenyan Government through the prestigious Moran of the Order of the Burning Spear (MBS) decoration. In 2002, the BBC recognised Sheldrick with their Lifetime Achievement Award. In the November 2005 issue of the Smithsonian magazine, Daphne Sheldrick was named as one of 35 people worldwide who have made a difference in terms of animal husbandry and wildlife conservation. Queen Elizabeth II promoted Daphne Sheldrick a Dame Commander of the Order of the British Empire in the 2006 New Year’s Honours List, "[f]or services to the conservation of wildlife, especially elephants, and to the local community in Kenya", the first damehood to be awarded in Kenya since the country received Independence in 1963.

Film and television

Sheldrick appeared as herself in the 2011 documentary Born to Be Wild.

She also had an appearance talking about an orphan elephant, which she took care of, which aired on PBS on the show "My Wild Affair".

References

Further reading

 60 Minutes/CBS News 2006 report, see , accessed 9 October 2014.
 NBC Nightly News August 2012 report, see , accessed 9 October 2014.
 The Sunday Times March 2012 article, see , accessed 9 October 2014.
 The Telegraph February 2012 article, see , accessed 9 October 2014.
 Dame Sheldrick's October 2013 HuffPost blog on The International March…, see , accessed 9 October 2014.
 National Geographic 2013 interview, see , accessed 9 October 2014.
 CBC's The Nature of Things September 2014 article, see , accessed 9 October 2014.
 BBC's current description of the Elephant Orphanage, see , accessed 9 October 2014.
 Red Flag Magazine Winter 2014 article, see , accessed 9 October 2014.
 Time magazine online video, undated, see , accessed 9 October 2014.

External links

 The Elephant Diaries official website
 Daphne Sheldrick's author page, ConvilleandWalsh.com; accessed 6 May 2014.
 Daphne Sheldrick at the British Film Institute

1934 births
2018 deaths
British conservationists
British women writers
Dames Commander of the Order of the British Empire
Deaths from breast cancer
Elephant conservation
Keepers of animal sanctuaries
Kenyan conservationists
Kenyan people of British descent
Kenyan women writers
Morans of the Order of the Burning Spear
Place of birth missing